Zeng Jinyan (born October 9, 1983), is a Chinese blogger and human rights activist. Zeng was put under house arrest in August 2006 and the blog that details her life under constant surveillance and police harassment has been subsequently blocked in China. Zeng continued to update her blog until July 27, 2008, before her disappearance.

Zeng Jinyan and Hu Jia made a 31-minute documentary, "Prisoners of Freedom City," of their seven-month house arrest from August 2006 to March 2007. The couple was placed under house arrest again, two months later on May 18, 2007, for harming state security. Zeng Jinyan is dubbed "Tiananmen 2.0." and selected as TIME Magazine's 100 People Who Shape Our World in 2007 as a hero and a pioneer.

One day before the opening ceremony of the 2008 Summer Olympics in Beijing, Zeng Jinyan was forcibly disappeared along with her baby daughter. She used to live in Hong Kong. Currently, she is an Oak Human Rights Fellow at Colby College.

References

External links
Zeng Jinyan's blog (in Chinese)
Clip of documentary, "Prisoners of Freedom City" on YouTube
The full documentary, "Prisoners of Freedom City" on the WITNESS Hub - Part 1, Part 2 & Part 3

Chinese human rights activists
Living people
1983 births
Weiquan movement
Chinese bloggers
Chinese women bloggers
People's Republic of China writers
People from Longyan
Hakka people
Hong Kong people of Hakka descent
Writers from Fujian